Canaan Land is a 2020 American comedy-drama film written and directed by Richard Rossi and starring Richard Rossi as Brother Billy and Rebecca Holden as Sister Sara Sunday.  It is based on the novel of the same name by Rossi. Like the novel it was based on, the film generated controversy at the time of its release from evangelical religious groups, who took issue with Rossi exposing fraudulent faith-healing techniques of well-known televangelists.

Background
After playing the lead role in a 1998 Los Angeles play version of the novel Elmer Gantry, Rossi was cast in the lead role of the con man preacher Elmer Gantry in a film remake of the 1960 Academy Award-winning film of the same name, slated to be directed by Amin Q. Chaudhri. Chaudhri sought investors for a $20 million budget.  The remake was never made, but Rossi began writing his own story of an Elmer Gantryish evangelist in a contemporary setting.
 
In March, 2016, it was reported that Rossi was in pre-production on his film Canaan Land. Rebecca Holden was cast to play Sister Sara Sunday.

Plot
Billy Gantry is an aging gigolo living in Beverly Hills in the house of his girlfriend, Connie.  He makes money giving telephone psychic readings. Connie catches him bedding his clients and kicks him out, leaving Billy homeless. He leaves with just his guitar and the clothes on his back.

Billy heads to the California Institute of Abnormalarts, a North Hollywood nightclub and sideshow.  Billy performs a song, singing and playing guitar with the house band.  The lyrics describe a street preacher, a persona Billy's therapist says is a manic side of Billy's personality, triggered by stress and loss. As Billy sings, clowns from the freak show dance.  Billy asks patrons of the nightclub to put him up for the night, but they refuse, knowing him to be a petty hustler.  Finally, Billy spots Pary, a woman who he performed psychic readings for earlier, and she invites him back to her place.  He talks her into lending him her red Jeep Cherokee and clothes from her late husband.

Billy, a former preacher, listens to the YouTube sermons of Sister Sara Sunday, a sincere evangelist with a small church.  Billy charms his way into her life and ministry.  Brother Billy and Sister Sara become tag-team preachers and romantic partners.

When Sara has to temporarily leave the church to care for her aging spiritual mother and mentor, ("Mother Grace"), Billy takes over.  He builds the church with fake miracles, including a staged resurrection, and gold glitter he claims is from the golden streets of Heaven.  He is aided by his friends Rocco (a seedy private eye), Laz (a Compton, California street kid), and Laz's father.  Billy's broadcasts on radio and TV include cameos by Hollywood stars.  Billy preaches at the Hollywood Bowl.

At the peak of his popularity, Billy is investigated by student reporters from a skepticism magazine.  They collaborate with a group of Me Too movement women who reveal how Billy conned them in the past to get sex and money.  Their videotaped testimonies are organized by Billy's Beverly Hills ex-girlfriend Connie and Psychic Insight (his former boss at the psychic network).  The scandal devastates Sara.  She throws Billy out of the church and breaks up with him.

After the breakup, Sara focuses on her ministry, preaching, singing at large Christian gatherings, and riding down Hollywood Boulevard as the queen of the Hollywood Christmas Parade.

Billy is homeless once again, and more depressed.  He jaywalks in a tunnel with semi-trailer trucks and stretches out his hands in a death wish, imitating Christ on the cross.  He visits a chapel and confesses he doesn't believe in God because a pastor abused him when he was a boy. Billy picks up a young prostitute named Angel who turns out to be his daughter whom he abandoned years ago.  She asks him to give faith one last chance.

Billy asks for a Christmas miracle to restore his faith.  He sincerely changes and wants to demonstrate his repentance by his actions.  He gives money back to the poor he conned into giving him "love offerings," assisted by Laz.  He returns Pary's red Jeep and gives her money to pay for driving her Jeep so long.  He visits an orphanage and prays for a little girl in a wheelchair but makes sure all cellphone cameras are off.  The girl experiences a miraculous recovery but Billy refuses to exploit it.

Billy dresses in white as a sign of purity and repentance and joins others from Sara's church at the Santa Monica beach.  Sara recognizes Billy is changing and forgives him, but is unwilling to reunite with him romantically.  She gives him her Bible and encourages him to stay on the right path.  Sara tearfully watches him walk away at the Santa Monica Pier and prays for Billy.

Cast

Release
The film was released in drive-in screenings rather than traditional theaters due to the COVID 19 pandemic to qualify for the Academy Awards, and on VOD (Video on demand) on January 5, 2021.

Reception
Alan Ng of Film Threat gave the film a 6 out of 10. It's West Coast theatrical premiere was a screening at the Marina Del Rey Film Festival, where Rebecca Holden won the Best Supporting Actress award. It's East Coast theatrical premiere was at the Great Lakes Christian Film Festival in New York, where Canaan Land won an award for the "Most Creative Feature Film," and Richard Rossi was nominated for Best Actor in a Narrative Feature Film.

References

External links
 
 

2020 films
2020 independent films
Films directed by Richard Rossi
American independent films
2020s English-language films
Films about Christianity
Films about evangelicalism
Films about religion
Films shot in Los Angeles
Christianity in popular culture controversies
Religious controversies in film
Religious drama films
Films about con artists
2020 comedy-drama films
American comedy-drama films
Films shot in California
Films with atheism-related themes
American rock music films